The Long Winter is a 1999 Quebec historical drama film. Directed by Michel Brault, it is a partly fictionalized account of the Lower Canada Rebellion of 1837 and 1838 which sought to make Lower Canada, now Quebec, a republic independent from the British Empire.

Description 
It features the fictional character of François-Xavier Bouchard and the factual character of François-Marie-Thomas Chevalier de Lorimier. The music was composed by François Dompierre. Film director Pierre Falardeau says that Telefilm Canada initially used the approval of Brault's film as an excuse to deny funds for the film February 15, 1839. This incited him to write a second Elvis Gratton film instead.

The main protagonist is Patriote François-Xavier Bouchard. The latter comes back to Lower Canada in the autumn of 1838 after having escaped to the United States (as a number of Patriotes did indeed), after the first uprising, in that year. As soon as he returns, despite the exhortations of his family, he joins François-Marie-Thomas Chevalier de Lorimier for another attempt. Following a hasty trial, Bouchard, Chevalier de Lorimier and others are sentenced to death.

Cast 
Francis Reddy as François-Xavier Bouchard
David Boutin as François-Marie-Thomas Chevalier de Lorimier
Micheline Lanctôt
Claude Gauthier
Emmanuel Bilodeau
Pierre Lebeau
Suzanne Clément as Angèle Bouchard
Rosalier Dumontier
Sylvain Landry
Philippe Lambert
Stéphane Simard
Robert Bouvier
Roc LaFortune
Julian Casey
James Bradford
Comedian Bruno Blanchet shot scenes for the film, but they were cut.

See also 
List of Quebec movies
Cinema of Quebec
Culture of Quebec
Patriote movement
Quebec nationalism
Quebec independence movement
History of Quebec
Timeline of Quebec history

External links

1999 films
Films set in 1838
1990s French-language films
Canadian war drama films
War films based on actual events
Lower Canada Rebellion war films
Quebec films
Films scored by François Dompierre
1990s war drama films
1999 drama films
French-language Canadian films
1990s Canadian films